Year 1304 (MCCCIV) was a leap year starting on Wednesday (link will display the full calendar) of the Julian calendar.

Events 
 By place 

 Byzantine Empire 
 Battle of Skafida: Emperor Michael IX (Palaiologos) sends a Byzantine expeditionary force (some 10,000 men) to halt the expansion of the Bulgarians in Thrace. The two armies meet near Sozopol on the Bulgarian Black Sea Coast. During the battle, the Bulgarian army led by Tsar Theodore Svetoslav is defeated and routed. The Byzantines, infatuated with the chase of the retreating enemy, crowd on a bridge – which possibly is sabotaged, and break down. The Bulgarians capture many Byzantine soldiers and some nobles are held for ransom. Svetoslav secures his territorial gains and stabilizes himself as the sole ruler of the Bulgarian Empire (until 1322).
 The Byzantines lose the island of Chios, in the Aegean Sea, to the Genoese under Admiral Benedetto I Zaccaria. He establishes an autonomous lordship and justifies the act to the Byzantine court as necessary to prevent the island from being captured by Turkish pirates. Benedetto is granted the island as a fief for a period of 10 years.Nicol, Donald M. (1993). The Last Centuries of Byzantium, 1261–1453, p. 113. (Second ed.). Cambridge: Cambridge University Press. . 
 December – Roger de Flor, Italian nobleman and adventurer, settle with the Catalan Company in Gallipoli and other towns in the southern part of Thrace and visits Constantinople to demands pay for his forces. He lives at the expense of the local population and uses the city as a base for his marauding raids in the surrounding area.

 Europe 
 August 8 – Treaty of Torrellas: The 18-year-old King Ferdinand IV (the summoned) signs a peace with King James II (the Just). In the terms, James agrees to restore the Kingdom of Murcia to Castile, except for Alicante, Elche, Orihuela, and lands north of the Segura River. In return for extensive patrimony, Prince Alfonso de la Cerda renounces his claim to the Castilian throne, ending a conflict that has disturbed the tranquility of the realm for nearly 30 years. 
 August 10–11 – Battle of Zierikzee: A French-Hollandic fleet (some 50 galleys) supported by Genoese ships led by Admiral Rainier I defeats the Flemish ships near Zierikzee. During the battle, the Flemish commander Guy of Namur is captured, and his fleet (which consists of Flemish, English, Hanseatic, Spanish and Swedish ships) is annihilated.
 August 18 – Battle of Mons-en-Pévèle: French forces (some 13,000 men) led by King Philip IV (the Fair) defeat a Flemish army at Mons-en-Pévèle. During the battle, the Flemish led by William of Jülich (the Younger) are forced to retreat to Lille. William is killed, and the French lose the Oriflamme ("Golden Flame"), the battle standard of Philip.
 August – Flemish forces under John II (the Peaceful) and Guy of Dampierre occupy Zeeland and Holland. In response, John II, count of Holland, recovers the counties. He restores his authority but dies on August 22.
 October 5 – Treaty of Treviso: After a dispute over salt works, the Italian commune of Padua and Venice sign a peace treaty, ending the Salt War. Venice establishes a salt monopoly and sells salt rights to merchants.

 England 
 February 9 – War of Scottish Independence: Scottish nobles led by Robert the Bruce and John Comyn (the Red), negotiate a peace treaty with King Edward I (Longshanks). His terms are accepted, and the Scots submit to English rule. In return, they are granted life and liberty under their old laws and freedom from the forfeiture of their lands. A few prominent nobles are singled out for temporary banishment – among them John de Soules, guardian of Scotland, who is exiled to France. No terms are offered to William Wallace, Edward's most wanted enemy, who remains defiantly at large despite every effort of Edward to capture him.
 February 20 – Battle of Happrew: Scottish rebels led by William Wallace and Simon Fraser fight guerilla warfare against Edward I (Longshanks). They defend themselves against a vanguard of English knights at Peebles, in the Scottish Borders. During the skirmish, the Scots are defeated and routed. Wallace and Fraser narrow escapes being captured.
 July 24 – Siege of Stirling Castle: Edward I (Longshanks) captures the Scottish rebel stronghold at Stirling. The castle is for four months bombarded by twelve siege engines. During the siege, Edward orders his engineer, Master James of St. George, to build a massive engine called the Warwolf. Eventually, William Oliphant and his garrison surrender.

 Middle East 
 October 24 – Ottoman-Turkish forces led by Sultan Osman I (or Othman) conquer the ancient city of Ephesus from the Byzantine Empire, massacring and deporting its native population.
 
 Asia 
 Ambassadors from the Mongol rulers of Central Asia and the Yuan Dynasty announce to Toqta Khan, Mongol ruler of the Golden Horde, their general peace proposal. Toqta accepts the supremacy of Emperor Temür Khan and all yams (postal relays) and commercial networks across the Mongol khanates reopen. In response, Toqta solidifies his rule upon the Rus' princes, who pledge allegiance to him at an assembly in Pereyaslavl.Martin, Janet (2007). Medieval Russia, 980–1584, p. 175. Cambridge University Press. .
 August – Sultan Alauddin Khalji orders a second invasion of Gujarat, which results in the annexation of the Kingdom of Vaghela into the Delhi Sultanate.Satish Chandra (2007). History of Medieval India: 800–1700, p. 103. Orient Longman. .

 By topic 

 Religion 
 July 7 – Pope Benedict XI dies after an 8-month pontificate in Perugia. Pro- and anti-French cardinals are unable to elect a successor (until 1305).
 The construction of Ypres Cloth Hall, in Ypres (modern Belgium), is completed.

Births 
 January 9 – Hōjō Takatoki, Japanese nobleman and regent (d. 1333)
 February 16 – Tugh Temür (or Wenzong), Mongol emperor (d. 1332)
 February 24 – Ibn Battuta, Moroccan scholar and explorer (d. 1369)
 May 2 – Margaret Mortimer, Anglo-Norman noblewoman (d. 1337)
 April 9 – Venturino of Bergamo, Italian monk and preacher (d. 1346)
 June 6 – Francesco Albergotti, Italian nobleman and jurist (d. 1376)
 July 20 – Francesco Petrarca, Italian historian and poet (d. 1374)
 October 4 – John Beauchamp, English peer and knight (d. 1343)
 October 17 
 Eleanor de Bohun, English noblewoman (d. 1363)
 James Butler, Irish nobleman and knight (d. 1338)
 Engelbert III, German archbishop (House of La Marck) (d. 1368)
 Gerard II de Lisle, English nobleman, peer and knight (d. 1360)
 Ibn al-Shatir, Syrian astronomer, engineer and writer (d. 1375)
 Joan of Valois, French noblewoman and princess (d. 1363)
 John of Aragon, Aragonese archbishop and patriarch (d. 1334)
 Lodewijk Heyligen, Flemish monk and music theorist (d. 1361)
 Magnus I (the Pious), German nobleman and knight (d. 1369)
 Marcus of Viterbo, Italian cardinal and papal legate (d. 1369)
 Marie of Luxemburg, queen of France and Navarre (d. 1324)
 Walram of Jülich, Dutch nobleman and archbishop (d. 1349)
 Walter VI, French nobleman, knight and constable (d. 1356)
 William de Clinton, English nobleman and admiral (d. 1354)

Deaths 
 January 13 – Ichijō Uchisane, Japanese nobleman (b. 1276) 
 February 14 – Guy of Ibelin, Outremer nobleman (House of Ibelin)
 March 6 – Fujiwara no Kimiko, Japanese empress consort (b. 1232)
 March 7 – Bartolomeo I della Scala, Italian nobleman and knight
 March 23 – John I (Chiano), Sardinian ruler (Judge of Arborea)
 March 26 – Wigbold von Holte, German archbishop and diplomat 
 April 1 – Albert I, Austrian nobleman, knight and co-ruler (b. 1240)
 April 11 – Maud de Lacy, Norman noblewoman (suo jure) (b. 1230)
 April 27 – Pedro Armengol, Spanish nobleman and priest (b. 1238)
 May 11 – Ghazan Khan, Mongol ruler of the Ilkhanate (b. 1271)
 May 23 – Jehan de Lescurel, French composer-poet and writer
 June 1 – Giovanni Pelingotto, Italian monk and hermit (b. 1240)
 June 5 – Abu Said Uthman I, Zenata Berber ruler of Tlemcen 
 June 6 – Maria of Portugal, Portuguese princess (b. 1264)
 July 7 – Benedict XI, pope of the Catholic Church (b. 1240)
 July 17 – Edmund Mortimer, English nobleman (b. 1251)
 July 27 – Andrey III, Kievan nobleman and Grand Prince
 August 10 – Martin of Dacia, Danish theologian (b. 1240)
 August 16 – John III, Dutch nobleman and knight (b. 1249)
 August 17 – Go-Fukakusa, Japanese emperor (b. 1243)
 August 18 – William of Jülich, Flemish nobleman (b. 1275)
 August 22 – John II, Dutch nobleman and knight (b. 1247)
 September 22 – Thomas of Corbridge, English archbishop
 September 27 – John de Warenne, English nobleman (b. 1231)
 September 28 – Elisabeth of Kalisz, Polish noblewoman (b. 1259)
 September 29 – Agnes of Brandenburg, Danish queen (b. 1257)
 December 5 – John of Pontoise, English archdeacon and bishop
 December 23 – Matilda of Habsburg, German co-ruler (b. 1253)
 Fernando Rodríguez de Castro, Spanish nobleman and knight
 Henry I, German nobleman and knight (House of Schaumburg)
 Henry II of Rodez, French nobleman and troubadour (b. 1236)
 João Afonso Telo, Portuguese nobleman, knight and diplomat
 Peter of Auvergne, French philosopher, theologian and writer
 Robert de Brus, Scoto-Norman nobleman and knight (b. 1243)
 Wang Yun, Chinese official, politician, poet and writer (b. 1228)

References